Against Our Will: Men, Women and Rape is a 1975 book about rape by Susan Brownmiller, in which the author argues that rape is "a conscious process of intimidation by which all men keep all women in a state of fear."

Summary
Brownmiller criticizes authors such as Richard von Krafft-Ebing, Sigmund Freud, Karl Marx, and Friedrich Engels for what she considers their oversights on the subject of rape. She defines rape as "a conscious process of intimidation by which all men keep all women in a state of fear". She writes that, to her knowledge, no zoologist has ever observed that animals rape in their natural habitat. Brownmiller sought to examine general belief systems that women who were raped deserved it, as discussed by Clinton Duffy and others. She discusses rape in war, challenges the Freudian concept of women's rape fantasies, and compares it to the gang lynchings of African Americans by white men. This comparison was used to show how lynching was once considered acceptable by communities, and then attitudes changed, followed by changed laws; Brownmiller hoped the same would happen with rape.

Reception
Against Our Will is credited by some with changing public outlooks and attitudes about rape. It is cited as having influenced changes in law regarding rape, such as state criminal codes that required a corroborating witness to a rape, and that permitted a defendant's lawyer to introduce evidence in court regarding a victim's prior sexual history. Mary Ellen Gale wrote in The New York Times Book Review that Against Our Will "deserves a place on the shelf next to those rare books about social problems which force us to make connections we have too long evaded, and change the way we feel about what we know." It was included in the "Women Rise" category of the New York Public Library's Books of the Century. The critic Christopher Lehmann-Haupt gave the book a mostly positive review in The New York Times, noting that Brownmiller "organized an enormous body of information into a multipurposed tool" that gave a program for modernizing rape laws while considering the treatment of rape in war overly detailed and numbing.

Others have taken a more critical view of the work. Gay scholar John Lauritsen dismissed Against Our Will, calling it "a shoddy piece of work from start to finish: ludicrously inaccurate, reactionary, dishonest, and vulgarly written." Angela Davis argued that Brownmiller disregarded the part that black women played in the anti-lynching movement and that Brownmiller's discussion of rape and race became an "unthinking partnership which borders on racism". Brownmiller's conclusions about rapists' motivations have been criticized by the anthropologist Donald Symons in The Evolution of Human Sexuality (1979), and by Randy Thornhill and Craig T. Palmer in A Natural History of Rape (2000). The historian Peter Gay wrote that Against Our Will "deserves pride of place among (rightly) indignant" feminist discussions of rape, but that Brownmiller's treatment of Sigmund Freud is unfair.

The critic Camille Paglia called Against Our Will well-meaning, but nevertheless dismissed it as an example of "the limitations of white middle-class assumptions in understanding extreme emotional states or acts." The behavioral ecologist John Alcock writes that while Brownmiller claimed that no zoologist had ever observed animals raping in their natural habitat, there was already "ample evidence" of forced copulations among animals in 1975, and that further evidence has accumulated since then.

In 2015, Time described this thesis as “startling,” and called Against Our Will a “convincing and awesome portrait of men’s cruelty to women.”

References

External links

1975 non-fiction books
American non-fiction books
Books about rape
English-language books
Feminist books
Radical feminist books
Feminism and sexuality
Second-wave feminism
Simon & Schuster books